Power broker is a political science term for a person who influences people to vote towards a particular client in exchange for political and financial benefits.

Power Broker may also refer to:

 Power Broker (character), a fictional corporation and character in the Marvel Universe
 Power Broker (Marvel Cinematic Universe), the live-action adaptation of the character
 Power Broker (horse), an American Thoroughbred racehorse
 "Power Broker" (The Falcon and the Winter Soldier), the third episode of the 2021 television series

See also
 The Power Broker, a 1974 book by Robert Caro